Archips brunneatus is a moth of the  family Tortricidae. It is found in Vietnam.

The wingspan is 20 mm. The ground colour of the forewings is brownish cinnamon. The suffusions and strigulation (fine streaks) are brownish and the subtornal area and apex are more brown. The hindwings are brownish with an apical area of cream orange marked with a few browner strigulae.

Etymology
The name refers to colouration of forewing and is derived from Latin brunneatus (meaning brown).

References

Moths described in 2009
Archips
Moths of Asia
Taxa named by Józef Razowski